Ledge or Ledges may refer to:

 Ridge, a geological feature
 Reef, an underwater feature
 Stratum, a layer of rock
 A narrow, flat area with cliff faces or steep slopes both below and above, a one sided cut into a cliff or mountain side
 Slang for legend or legendary
 Window ledge
 Wisconsin Ledge AVA (American Viticultural Area)
 Ledges (album)
 Ledges State Park

See also
 Mia Vlajkovic
 The Ledge (disambiguation)